Wyoming Highway 77 (WYO 77) is a  long Wyoming  state highway in northeastern Carbon County. The highway begins at WYO 487 and proceeds north, parallel to the highway, to a northern terminus at WYO 487.

Route description

Highway 77 stays to the west of Highway 487 and Shirley Basin, acting as an alternative route to Highway 487 between the two points.

History
Wyoming Highway 77 was formerly numbered as Highway 487 while present day Highway 487 was designated as Highway 75. Highway 75 was created during the early 1970s with the creation of the Wyoming secondary state route system. When Highway 487 was rerouted over Highway 75 in the mid-1970s, old Highway 487 was redesignated as Highway 77.

Major intersections

See also

References

External links

 Wyoming Routes 000-099
 WYO 77 - WYO 487 to WYO 487

Transportation in Carbon County, Wyoming
077